Little Inkberrow is a village in Worcestershire, England.

Ralph Ardern inherited the Worcestershire manor of Little Inkberrow  between 1382 (the death of his father, Henry de Ardern) and 1408 (the death of his mother).

References

Villages in Worcestershire